UDP-2,3-diacetamido-2,3-dideoxyglucuronic acid 2-epimerase (UDP-GlcNAc3NAcA 2-epimerase, UDP-alpha-D-GlcNAc3NAcA 2-epimerase, 2,3-diacetamido-2,3-dideoxy-alpha-D-glucuronic acid 2-epimerase, WbpI, WlbD) is an enzyme with systematic name 2,3-diacetamido-2,3-dideoxy-alpha-D-glucuronate 2-epimerase. This enzyme catalyses the following chemical reaction

 UDP-2,3-diacetamido-2,3-dideoxy-alpha-D-glucuronate  UDP-2,3-diacetamido-2,3-dideoxy-alpha-D-mannuronate

This enzyme participates in the biosynthetic pathway for UDP-alpha-D-ManNAc3NAcA.

References

External links 
 

EC 5.1.3